Zarrin Khani (also Romanized as Zarrīn Khānī and Zarrīn Khāneh) is a village in Chalanchulan Rural District, Silakhor District, Dorud County, Lorestan Province, Iran. At the 2006 census, its population was 50, in 15 families.

References 

Towns and villages in Dorud County